Suryakanta Patil (born 15 August 1948) was a member of the 14th Lok Sabha of India. She represented the Hingoli & Nanded constituency of Maharashtra and was a member of the Nationalist Congress Party (NCP). Later in 2014, resigned from party and joined Bhartiya Janata Party along with Dr. Madhavrao Kinhalkar.

She was the Minister of State in the Ministry of Rural Development and Minister of State in the Ministry of Parliamentary Affairs.
Place of Birth: Waiphana, Nanded, Maharashtra.
Marital Status: Married on 2 January 1966.

As Journalist
 Editor, Godawari Times – a daily in Marathi

President- District Journalist Association (associated with Akhil Bhartiya Patrakar Parishad) since 1980.

Journalist-Editor

Literacy Artistic and Scientific  Accomplishment

Political career
 Corporator, Nanded-Waghala Municipal Corporation

Within Party
1971: President-District Congress Committee (women's Wing), Nanded.

1972–74: General Secretary-District Youth Congress

1977–78:                       	Founder- Member D.C.C. (India) Nanded

1980: Member- Municipal Council Nanded

1980–85: Member- Maharashtra Legislative Assembly (Hadgaon)

1981–82: Chairperson- Committee of Subordinate Legislation

1981–85: General Secretary- Pradesh Youth Congress (I), Maharashtra

1991–96: Executive Member-CPP Congress Parliamentary Party (I)

1997–98: Vice President- Pradesh Congress Committee

In Legislature
1986–91: MP-(Rajya Sabha) elected from Maharashtra from Indian National Congress party.

1988–89: Member- Consultative Committee, Ministry of Petroleum and Chemicals

1988–90: Member,Committee of Rules
 Member of Hindi Salahakar Samity, Ministry of steel and mines and Ministry of Water Resources
 Member- Central Advisory Committee for Light House, Ministry of Surface Transport

1991: Elected to 10th Loksabha from Nanded Loksabha constituency

1998: Re-elected on 12th Loksabha (2nd term)

1998–99: Member Committee of Defense and its Sub-Committee-I
Member Joint Committee of Empowerment of women and its Sub Committee on Appraisal of laws relating to women -Criminal Laws

1999–2004: Vice Chairperson- of Maharashtra Council of Agriculture Education and Research (MCAER), Pune

2004–2009 – MP & Minister of state in Ministry of Rural Development from NCP Quota.

Special interest

Solving problems of women, Labour Movements, rural Development and Upliftment of poor and downtrodden

Favorite Pastime Recreation:  Reading, listening to music and enjoying nature

Sports and Clubs: Swimming, shooting and table-tennis

Political and social worker, Trade Unionist

Countries Visited
Japan, U.S.A., China, Egypt, U.K., Germany, New Zealand, U.A.E, Guatemala, Nicaragua.

Other Information

Imprisoned thrice during Janata regime and appeared before the Shah Commission.

Member Consultative Committee Ministry of Environment and Forest
 Chairperson- Education Committee of  Municipal Council, Nanded.
 Chairperson: Mahila Udyog Vikas Santha since its formation in 1977–78
 Founding President: Multipurpose Labour Union, Nanded
 President: Hutatma Jaywantrao Patil Cooperative Sugar Factory, Suryanagar Tq. Hadgaon Dist. Nanded 
 Director-District Nanded Cooperative Consumer Federation since 1988; 
 Director: Maharashtra State Co-operative Bank, Mumbai.

References

External links
 Official biographical sketch in Parliament of India website

Living people
1948 births
Trade unionists from Maharashtra
Maharashtra MLAs 1980–1985
Rajya Sabha members from Maharashtra
India MPs 2004–2009
Union ministers of state of India
Marathi politicians
People from Yavatmal
Nationalist Congress Party politicians from Maharashtra
India MPs 1998–1999
India MPs 1991–1996
Lok Sabha members from Maharashtra
People from Hingoli district
Women members of the Maharashtra Legislative Assembly
People from Marathwada
Indian women journalists
20th-century Indian journalists
Indian women trade unionists
20th-century Indian women politicians
20th-century Indian politicians
Women union ministers of state of India
Maharashtra municipal councillors
People from Nanded
Women members of the Rajya Sabha
Women members of the Lok Sabha
Bharatiya Janata Party politicians from Maharashtra
21st-century Indian women politicians